Eric Magnusson (1268 – 15 July 1299) (Old Norse: Eiríkr Magnússon; Norwegian: Eirik Magnusson) was the King of Norway from 1280 until 1299.

Background
Eirik was the eldest surviving son of King Magnus the Lawmender of Norway, and his wife, Ingeborg, daughter of King Eric IV of Denmark. In 1273, when he was 5 years old, he was given the title of king, alongside his father, who planned to hold a coronation for Eirik as his subordinate co-ruler in the summer of 1280. However, King Magnus died before this could be arranged, and Eirik became sole king and was crowned as such in Bergen in the summer of 1280. During his minority, the kingdom was ruled by a royal council consisting of prominent barons and probably also his mother, the dowager queen Ingeborg. After Eirik came of age in 1282, this royal council is still thought to have had a major influence over his reign. His brother, Haakon, was in 1273 given the title "Duke of Norway", and from 1280 ruled a large area around Oslo in Eastern Norway and Stavanger in the southwest, subordinate to King Eirik. The king's main residence was in Bergen in Western Norway.

Eirik married princess Margaret of Scotland, daughter of King Alexander III of Scotland in Bergen in 1281. Margaret died two years later in childbirth, giving birth to Margaret, Maid of Norway, who was to be Queen of Scotland, but she died in 1290. Her death sparked the disputed succession which led to the Wars of Scottish Independence. Eirik briefly and unsuccessfully laid claim to the Scottish crown as inheritance from his daughter.

Eirik later married Isabel Bruce, sister of King Robert I of Scotland. Their marriage did not produce a surviving male heir, although it did produce a daughter, Ingebjørg Eiriksdatter of Norway, who married Valdemar Magnusson of Sweden, Duke of Finland, in 1312 and was then styled Duchess of Öland.

Reign

A prominent feature of Eirik's reign was the war with Denmark, called the War of the Outlaws (De fredløses krig), which was waged on and off from 1289 until 1295. A major motivation for this warfare was Eirik's claim on his mother's Danish inheritance. In 1287, he entered into an alliance with a group of Danish nobles, most prominently Jacob Nielsen, Count of Halland and Stig Andersen Hvide, who were outlawed in Denmark for allegedly murdering the Danish king Eric V. Eirik gave the outlaws sanctuary in Norway in 1287. King Eirik himself led a large Norwegian fleet which, along with the Danish outlaws, attacked Denmark in 1289, burning Elsinore and threatening Copenhagen. Renewed naval attacks on Denmark were made in 1290 and 1293, before peace was made in 1295.

As Eirik died without sons, he was succeeded by his brother, as Haakon V of Norway. He was buried in the old cathedral of Bergen, which was demolished in 1531. Its site is marked by a memorial, in present-day Bergenhus Fortress.

References

1268 births
1299 deaths
13th-century Norwegian monarchs
Medieval child monarchs
Burials at Christ Church, Bergen
House of Sverre
Fairhair dynasty
Competitors for the Crown of Scotland